Maalika Paniyunnavar is a 1979 Indian Malayalam film, directed and produced by Sreekumaran Thampi. The film stars Mahendran, Sukumaran and Anandavally in the lead roles. The film featured original songs composed by K. J. Yesudas and M. K. Arjunan.

Plot synopsis
Kuttappan, a laborer, helps his friend's sister marry her lover, Krishnan. Later, when he finds that Krishnan has another family, he decides to take care of them.

Cast
 
Sukumaran as Kuttappan
Anandavally as Devaki
Geetha as Thresia
Mallika Sukumaran as Meenakshi
Nellikode Bhaskaran as Chellappan
Roja Ramani as Kalyani
Y. G. Mahendran as Krishnan Mesthiri
P. K. Vanukuttan Nair as Paulose
Maniyanpilla Raju as Ouseph
Adoor Bhavani as Kuttappan's mother
 Kailasnath as Appunni
 Payyannur Aravind	
 Sasi Mesthiri	
 Baby Vinodini as Meenakshi's daughter
 Master Prathapan as Meenakshi's son

Soundtrack
The music was composed by K. J. Yesudas and M. K. Arjunan.

References

External links
 

1979 films
1970s Malayalam-language films
Films directed by Sreekumaran Thampi